This is a list of the current members of the Parliament of Tuvalu or Palamene o Tuvalu as elected at the 2019 Tuvaluan general election.

Members elected for the first time at the 2019 general election are noted with *

Nanumaga by-election 2022
Following the death of Minute Alapati Taupo on 23 May 2022, the Reverend Dr Kitiona Tausi was elected to represent Nanumaga in the by-election held on 15 July 2022.

Tausi, who had been the chairman of the Tuvalu Broadcasting Corporation Board of Directors, received 240 votes, beating Hamoa Holona who received 199 votes, and Alapati Rick Minute Taupo who received 179 votes.

References

MPs